The Zentrum Paul Klee is a museum dedicated to the artist Paul Klee, located in Bern, Switzerland and designed by the Italian architect Renzo Piano. It features about 40 percent of Paul Klee's entire pictorial oeuvre.

In 1997, Livia Klee-Meyer, Paul Klee's daughter-in-law, donated her inheritance of almost 690 works to the city and canton of Bern. Additional works and documents donated and loaned by the family and the Paul-Klee-Foundation and a further 200 on loans. from private collections contributed to creating a very large collection of works by the artist. The decision to build the museum in the Schöngrün site on the eastern outskirts of the city was made in 1998, and renowned Italian architect Renzo Piano was contracted the same year. A preliminary project was elaborated in 2000. The building was completed in 2005. It takes the form of three undulations blending into the landscape.

See also
 List of single-artist museums

Other projects

Notes

External links
 Website of the Zentrum Paul Klee (English Version)
 Picture Database of the artist Paul Klee
 Zentrum Paul Klee Virtual Tour

Art museums and galleries in Switzerland
Museums in Bern
Biographical museums in Switzerland
Klee, Paul
Art museums established in 2005
Buildings and structures completed in 2005
2005 establishments in Switzerland
Renzo Piano buildings
Modernist architecture in Switzerland
Paul Klee
21st-century architecture in Switzerland